Christian Toft (born 14 December 1968) is a Danish breaststroke swimmer. He competed in two events at the 1988 Summer Olympics.

References

External links
 

1968 births
Living people
Danish male breaststroke swimmers
Olympic swimmers of Denmark
Swimmers at the 1988 Summer Olympics
Swimmers from Copenhagen